The 1991 Full Members' Cup final, also known by its sponsored name, the Zenith Data Systems Cup, was a football match which took place at Wembley Stadium on 7 April 1991. It was contested between Crystal Palace and Everton. The winners were Crystal Palace by the margin of 4–1 after extra time.

Match details

Summary
The contest in front of a crowd where Palace fans outnumbered Everton 2 to 1 was a physical affair which saw Palace players Andy Thorn and Geoff Thomas booked for fouls, Andy Gray substituted after a head collision caused concussion and the Everton defender Martin Keown suffering a broken nose. The pitch itself was uneven, having hosted an American Football match the evening before. The first half was largely uneventful in terms of footballing action, with Gray's 45 yard freekick for Palace in the 38th minute the only incident to come close, striking the crossbar. The second half was more lively, with Geoff Thomas scoring for Palace in the 66th minute with a diving header from a John Salako corner. Everton equalised quickly, with the Polish midfielder Robert Warzycha netting in the 69th minute. Neither side could finish the job in 90 minutes, and the game went to extra time.

Palace took the lead in the 101st minute when Ian Wright latched onto a long kick from goalkeeper Nigel Martyn to score. John Salako quickly made it three for Palace with a header in the 113th minute before Wright followed up quickly with his second and Palace's fourth in the 115th minute. At full-time Everton's goalkeeper Neville Southall refused to receive his medal, remaining on the pitch as his team mates climbed the Wembley steps to collect their runners up awards.

Details

References

1992
1991–92 in English football
Full Members' Cup 1991
Full Members' Cup 1991
April 1991 sports events in the United Kingdom
1991 sports events in London